The Karnataka Legislative Assembly, formerly the Mysore Legislative Assembly or Mysore Representative Assembly, is the lower house of the bicameral legislature of the southern Indian state of Karnataka. Karnataka is one of the six states in India where the state legislature is bicameral, comprising two houses: the Vidhan Sabha (lower house) and the Vidhan Parishad (upper house).

There are 224 Members of the Legislative Assembly (MLAs) and are directly elected by people through adult franchise. Karnataka is thus divided into 224 constituencies to elect members to the Assembly, each constituency electing one member. The assembly is elected using the simple plurality or "first past the post" electoral system. The elections are conducted by the Election Commission of India. 

The normal term of the members lasts for five years. In case of death, resignation, or disqualification of a member, a by-election is conducted for constituency represented by the member. The party, or coalition which has the majority becomes the ruling party.

History

Mysore Representative Assembly was constituted in 1881 by Maharaja Chamaraja Wadiyar X, the first of its kind in a British India kingdom. It formed the Kingdom's sole unicameral legislature until when, in 1907, an upper house was carved out of it to form the Mysore Legislative Council, resulting in the Assembly's functioning as the lower house.

On 16 December 1949, Maharaja Jayachamaraja Wadiyar dissolved the sitting representative and legislative assemblies. A constituent assembly that was constituted in 1947 became the provisional assembly of Mysore until elections were held in 1952.

On Wednesday, 18 June 1952, at 11:00 am, the first session of the newly-formed Mysore Legislative Assembly was held at the old Public Office building conference hall (present-day High Court building) in Bangalore. The first assembly formed under the Constitution had 99 elected and one nominated member. In the first sitting of the state assembly, V. Venkatappa was the honorary speaker who administered oath to the members including the then Chief Minister Kengal Hanumanthaiah. He conducted an election to the post of speaker, which was contested by socialist leader Shantaveri Gopalagowda, and H. Siddaiah, where H. Siddaiah secured 74 votes and emerged victoriously and the first CM of Karnataka state Kengal Hanumanthaiah delivered the speech.

With the formation of Andhra state in 1953, parts of Bellary district from Madras State were added to Mysore state and the strength of the Assembly increased by five members.  After the re-organization of the state of Mysore came into being on 1 November 1956 with four districts from the former Bombay state, three districts of Hyderabad state, a district, and taluk of the old Madras state of Coorg, and the princely state of Mysore. The state was renamed Karnataka in 1973.

The first sitting of the new assembly was held on 19 December 1956 in the newly built Vidhana Soudha. The strength of the assembly, which was 208 in 1957 increased to 216 in 1967 and to 224 plus a nominated member in 1978.

The lone women Speaker of the Karnataka assembly was K. S. Nagarathanamma from 24 March 1972 to 3 March 1978.

The Budget Session and The Monsoon Session of the Legislature are held in Vidhana Soudha, Bengaluru. The Winter Session of the Legislature is held in Suvarna Soudha, Belagavi.

List of assemblies

President's rule in the state

Members of Legislative Assembly 

Source: Fifteenth Karnataka Legislative Assembly members list

Council of Ministers

See also 
Vidhana Soudha
Government of Karnataka
Karnataka Legislative Council
List of chief ministers of Karnataka
List of speakers of the Karnataka Legislative Assembly

References

External links

 Karnataka Lok Sabha Election 2019 Result Website

 

 
State lower houses in India